Jafar Bazri, (born 16 August 1987) is an Iranian footballer.

Club career
Bazri joined Aluminium in 2012 after spending the previous season at Shahrdari Tabriz. He stayed with Aluminium after the team got relegated to the Azadegan League.

References

External links

Profile on Persianleague

Living people
Association football forwards
Shahrdari Tabriz players
Gahar Zagros players
Foolad Yazd players
Aluminium Hormozgan F.C. players
Iranian footballers
1987 births